James Scott Brady (August 29, 1940 – August 4, 2014) was an American public official who served as assistant to the U.S. president and the 17th White House Press Secretary, serving under President Ronald Reagan. In 1981, Brady became permanently disabled from a gunshot wound during the attempted assassination of Ronald Reagan by John Hinckley Jr., just two months and 10 days after Reagan's inauguration.

Brady's death in 2014 was eventually ruled a homicide, caused by the gunshot wound he received 33 years earlier.

Early career 
Brady began his career in public service as a staff member in the office of Republican Illinois senator Everett Dirksen. In 1964, he was the campaign manager for congressional candidate Wayne Jones in the race for Illinois's 23rd district. In 1970, Brady directed a campaign in the same district for Phyllis Schlafly.

Brady served in various positions in both the private sector and government, including service as special assistant to Secretary of Housing and Urban Development James Thomas Lynn; special assistant to the director of the Office of Management and Budget; assistant to the Secretary of Defense; and staff member of Senator William V. Roth, Jr. (R-DE). He also served as press secretary in 1979 to presidential candidate John Connally.

After Connally withdrew his candidacy, Brady became the director of public affairs and research for the Reagan–Bush Committee, then spokesperson for the Office of the President-elect. After Reagan took office, Brady became White House press secretary.

Shooting 

On March 30, 1981, 69 days into his presidency, Ronald Reagan and his cabinet members and staff, including Brady, were leaving the Washington Hilton hotel when a gunman opened fire. The first of six bullets hit Brady. The gunman was 25-year-old John Hinckley Jr., who thought that killing the President would impress actress Jodie Foster, with whom Hinckley had an unhealthy obsession.

Secret Service and police officers forced Hinckley to the ground and arrested him. He had fired six shots from a .22 caliber Röhm RG-14 revolver. The bullet hit Brady in the head above his left eye, passing underneath his brain and shattering his brain cavity, exploding on impact. President Reagan, Secret Service agent Tim McCarthy, and Metropolitan Police officer Thomas Delahanty were also injured in the shooting. Brady, Reagan and McCarthy were taken to George Washington University Hospital in Washington, D.C.

During the confusion that ensued from the shooting, all major media outlets reported that Brady had died. At the time, he was 40 years old. When ABC News anchorman Frank Reynolds, a personal friend of Brady, was later forced to retract the report, he angrily said on-air to his staff, "C'mon, let's get it nailed down!", as a result of the miscommunication.

During the hours-long operation on Brady at the George Washington University Hospital, surgeon Arthur Kobrine was informed of the media's announcement of Brady's death, to which he said, "No one has told me and the patient."

Although Brady survived, the wound left him with slurred speech and partial paralysis that required full-time use of a wheelchair. Kobrine, his neurosurgeon, described him as having difficulty controlling his emotions while speaking after the shooting, saying "he would kind of cry-talk for a while", and having deficits in memory and thinking, such as failing to recognize people.

Brady was unable to work as White House press secretary but remained in the position until the end of the Reagan administration with Larry Speakes and Marlin Fitzwater performing the job on an "acting" or "deputy" basis.

Gun control advocate 
With his wife Sarah Brady, who served as chair of the Brady Campaign to Prevent Gun Violence, Brady subsequently lobbied for stricter handgun control and assault weapon restrictions. The Brady Handgun Violence Prevention Act, also known as "the Brady Bill", was named in his honor.

Brady received an honorary degree of Doctor of Laws from McKendree College, Lebanon, Illinois, in 1982. Sarah and James Brady were each awarded a doctorate degree (of Humane Letters) by Drexel University in 1993. In 1994, James and Sarah received the S. Roger Horchow Award for Greatest Public Service by a Private Citizen, an award given out annually by the Jefferson Awards Foundation. In 1994, James and Sarah received the Golden Plate Award of the American Academy of Achievement. In 1996, Brady received the Presidential Medal of Freedom from President Bill Clinton, the highest civilian award in the United States.

Personal life 
Brady married Sue Beh in 1960. The marriage ended in divorce in 1967. In 1972, Brady married Sarah Jane Kemp and they joined an Episcopal Church.

In 2000, the White House press briefing room was renamed the James S. Brady Press Briefing Room in his honor.

Death 
Brady died on August 4, 2014, in Alexandria, Virginia. Four days later, the medical examiner ruled that his death was a homicide, caused by the gunshot wound which he sustained in 1981. Hinckley did not face any charges for Brady's death because he had been found not guilty by reason of insanity. In addition, since Brady's death occurred more than 33 years after the shooting, prosecution of Hinckley was barred under the year and a day law in effect in the District of Columbia at the time of the shooting.

Portrayals in film 
Brady's recovery after the shooting was dramatized in the 1991 HBO film Without Warning: The James Brady Story, with Brady portrayed by Beau Bridges. Brady was also portrayed by John Connolly in the 2001 Showtime film The Day Reagan Was Shot. Michael H. Cole portrayed him in the 2016 television film Killing Reagan.

Season 1, Episode 4, "In Control" of the television series The Americans takes place on the day of Reagan's assassination attempt as the main characters try to figure out what is happening. The episode depicts the media misreporting Brady having died before issuing the correction that he is still alive.

References

External links 

 A Final Walk with Jim Brady
 
 Brady Death Ruled Homicide
 Opinion James Brady and the case for gun safety laws

1940 births
2014 deaths
American gun control activists
American people with disabilities
Attempted assassination of Ronald Reagan
Blind activists
American blind people
Burials in Pennsylvania
Crimes in Washington, D.C.
Deaths by firearm in Virginia
Illinois Republicans
People from Centralia, Illinois
People with paraplegia
People with traumatic brain injuries
Presidential Medal of Freedom recipients
Reagan administration personnel
University of Illinois Urbana-Champaign alumni
White House Press Secretaries
American civil servants